Amorphoscelis brunneipennis is a species of praying mantis found in India and Sri Lanka.

References

Amorphoscelis
Endemic fauna of India
Endemic fauna of Sri Lanka
Insects described in 1956